Bastrop Academy, later renamed Bastrop Military Institute, was located in Bastrop, Texas.

In 1851, the citizens of Bastrop, in the form of the Bastrop Educational Society, founded the Bastrop Academy, and the school received its charter on January 24, 1852. Professor William J. Hancock of Aberdeen, Mississippi became the first headmaster at the Academy, and the Bastrop Female Academy was incorporated. On arrival, Hancock built what is now referred to as the Allen-Fowler House at 1404 Wilson Street, not only for him and his family, but also for student boarders. 

Bastrop Academy was rechartered on February 7, 1853, under the jurisdiction of the Methodist Episcopal Church, South. Administrators built a two-story pine building for $15,000; it had separate male and female study halls and a library of 1,000 volumes. The enrollment was 132 for the first session and increased to 194 by 1857. The academy became one of the leading schools in Texas.

In 1857, the male part of Bastrop Academy became Bastrop Military Institute, which trained young men for service during the Civil War. Colonel Robert Thomas Pritchard Allen replaced Hancock as headmaster and Allen and his wife Julia purchased Fowler House. They continued to board cadets that attended the Institute.

After the war, the Institute moved to Austin, and on May 25, 1872, the City of Bastrop purchased the property of the academy and it became a part of the Bastrop public school system. The city used the buildings for a variety of schools, until a public school system was established in 1892.

In 1876, the headmaster's residence and boarding house was sold to John Preston Fowler and Maud Maynard Fowler. They added Victorian detailing and a projecting bay window to the structure. Fowler became mayor of Bastrop, county attorney and a Texas state senator.

In 1892, the city sold the Academy property at 1402 Church Street to Dr. H.P. Luckett, a prominent citizen who had practiced medicine in the town for almost 50 years. Luckett demolished the existing structures, and built the H. P. Luckett House on the site.

References

Further reading
William Henry Korges, Bastrop County, Texas: Historical and Educational Development (M.A. thesis, University of Texas, 1933)
Bill Moore, Bastrop County, 1691–1900 (Wichita Falls: Nortex, 1977)

Buildings and structures in Bastrop County, Texas
Defunct schools in Texas